Vincent Keoni Manuwai (July 12, 1980 – November 4, 2018) was an American football guard. He was drafted in the third round of the 2003 NFL Draft by the Jacksonville Jaguars. He played college football for the University of Hawaii Warriors.

Early years
Manuwai was born in Honolulu, Hawaii. He attended Farrington High School in Honolulu, where he earned varsity letters three times each in football and track and field and once in basketball. In football, he earned All-Conference and All-State honors.  In track and field, he was All-League in the shot put, and first team All-League and second team All-State in the discus throw.  Vincent Manuwai graduated from Farrington High School in 1999.

College career
Manuwai attended the University of Hawaii, where he played for the Hawaii Warriors football team. He was a three-year starter and played all positions on the line. He was regarded as one of the best pass protectors in the country.  He did not allow a sack in his last 35 games as a starter with 60 knockdowns. Manuwai honors include:All-America first-team choice by College Football News as a senior,  All-WAC first-team, received the Warrior Club Award (team's best player). He majored in sociology.

Professional career

Jacksonville Jaguars
Manuwai was drafted by the Jacksonville Jaguars in the third round (72nd pick overall) of the 2003 NFL Draft.

Manuwai was one of the key factors in Jacksonville's rushing success. Through the 2007 season, Manuwai started all but one game for the Jaguars and was the most successful player on the offensive line. With Manuwai as guard, the Jaguars offense rushed for 2,541 yards in 2006 and 2,391 in 2007. In 2008, however, he suffered anterior cruciate ligament (ACL) and medial collateral ligament (MCL) injuries and was placed on injured reserve for the remainder of the season. He returned in 2009, and spent the season overcoming his injury and other obstacles. In 2010, he was replaced on the starting line by Justin Smiley. He recovered the starting spot when Smiley was injured in October, and became a significant factor in the emergence of Jacksonville's formidable running game.

On July 29, 2011, Manuwai was released by Jacksonville.

Atlanta Falcons
The Atlanta Falcons signed Manuwai on March 9, 2012. He was released on July 28, 2012.

Death
Manuwai died on November 4, 2018, at the age of 38, after reportedly collapsing while moving into an apartment in Honolulu, Hawaii. The cause of death was an ecstasy intoxication.

References

External links
 Atlanta Falcons bio

1980 births
2018 deaths
American football offensive guards
Hawaii Rainbow Warriors football players
Jacksonville Jaguars players
Atlanta Falcons players
Players of American football from Honolulu
American sportspeople of Samoan descent
Drug-related deaths in Hawaii